Muhammad Sharif (cosmologist) (Urdu: محمد شريف) (15 June 1962), TI, FPAS, is a Pakistani professor, specialised in mathematical physics and cosmology.  He worked as the chairman of the department of Mathematics, University of the Punjab (PU), Lahore for six years, i.e., from 2013-2019. Now, Sharif has been appointed as Dean, Faculty of Science at University of the Punjab. He is a Higher Education Commission (HEC) Distinguished National Professor. He has been awarded with the Izaz-Fazeelat and Tamgha-i-Imtiaz by the government of Pakistan.

Biography

Sharif's father earned his living through agriculture.

After graduating from The Islamia University of Bahawalpur, Sharif proceeded to join Quaid-e-Azam University (QAU), initially focusing to become a good mathematician. In this respect, Sharif was enrolled at QAU in Islamabad where he excelled in courses of mathematics and physics and received MSc Mathematics in 1985.

In the same year, Sharif pursued his M.Phil applied Mathematics, followed by PhD in Mathematical physics under the supervision of Asghar Qadir. He obtained PhD degree in 1991.

Education and career 

Sharif completed a postdoctoral Fellowship in South Korea and another in the UK.

Sharif has participated and attended more than 60 International and National workshops and conferences in his field. He has published more than 333 research papers and his work has been cited more than 3000 times by national and international researchers. He had organised an International Conference on Relativistic Astrophysics in University of the Punjab, Lahore-Pakistan during 10–14 February 2015, in which people from all over the world had participated. The aim of this conference is to celebrate 100 years of Einstein's theory of general relativity.

Sharif made painstaking efforts to spread awareness among Pakistani young students about writing more and more number of research papers in the field of relativity.

Awards and fellowships 

 Post-Doctoral Fellowship awarded by Korea Science and Engineering Foundation (KOSEF) (2000).
 Research Productivity Allowance (2001–2008) awarded by Pakistan Council of Science and Technology(PCST).
 Tamgha-e-Imtiaz awarded by Government of Pakistan (23 March 2008).
 Best Research Paper Award awarded by Higher Education Commission (17 December 2009).
 Pakistan Academy of Sciences Gold Medal awarded by Pakistan Academy of Sciences (22 December 2009).
 Best Research Paper Award awarded by Higher Education Commission (March 2015).

Selected research papers 

 General formula for the momentum imparted to test particles in arbitrary spacetimes (1992) by A. Qadir and M. Sharif
 Matter collineations of spacetime homogeneous Gödel-type metrics (2003) by U. Camci and M. Sharif.
 Matter Inheritance Symmetries of Spherically Symmetric Static Spacetimes (2005) by M. Sharif
 Isothermal Plasma Waves in Gravitomagnetic Planar Analogue (2007) by M. Sharif and U. Sheikh.
 Cosmological evolution for dark energy models in f(T) gravity (2012) by M. Sharif and S. Azeem.

References

External links 
List of publications

1962 births
Living people
Pakistani Muslims
Punjabi people
Pakistani cosmologists
20th-century Pakistani mathematicians
21st-century Pakistani mathematicians
Fellows of Pakistan Academy of Sciences
Academic staff of the University of the Punjab
Islamia University of Bahawalpur alumni
Quaid-i-Azam University alumni